Marthen Douw is a politician from Papua. He was elected as a member of the Indonesian Parliament for 2019–2024. He is the only member of the National Awakening Party from the national electoral district of Papua. Despite his young age, he was a member of the Regional Representative Council of the Nabire Regency for the period 2014–2019.

Career 
In 2019, he was elected as a member of the People's Representative Council. He is on Commission VII focusing on energy, research and technology and natural environment.

On September 1, 2020, Marthen Douw requested the People's Representative Council to extend the time to discuss Papua's special autonomy status.

References 

Members of the People's Representative Council, 2019
1980 births
Living people
People from Nabire Regency